Alexander Ward (born 30 April 1990) is a retired British tennis player.

Early life
Ward was born on 30 April 1990 in Northampton, Northamptonshire, England. He was educated at Northampton School for Boys.

Tennis career
Ward has a career high ATP singles ranking of 242 achieved on 6 June 2016. He also has a career high ATP doubles ranking of 379 achieved on 9 September 2013.

Ward made his ATP main draw debut at the 2013 MercedesCup after defeating Sandro Ehrat, Dustin Brown and Ivo Minář in the qualifying rounds. In the main draw he drew fifth seed Fabio Fognini, but lost 3–6, 6–7(5–7)

Having come through qualifying as the world No. 855, Ward competed at the 2017 Wimbledon Championships, where he lost to compatriot Kyle Edmund in four sets in the first round.

In September 2018, Ward announced his retirement from professional tennis.

ATP Challenger and ITF Futures finals

Singles: 27 (16–10)

Doubles: 12 (4–8)

References

External links
 
 
 

1990 births
Living people
People educated at Northampton School for Boys
English male tennis players
British male tennis players
Tennis people from Northamptonshire